The WSE Champions League is an annual club roller hockey competition organised by the World Skate Europe - Rink Hockey and contested by teams from the top-ranked European leagues. It is the top-level European club competition and its winner earns the right to play the Continental Cup, against the winners of the second-tier World Skate Europe Cup, and the Intercontinental Cup, against the winners of the South American Club Championship.

The current champions are Italian side Trissino, having beaten Portuguese side AD Valongo in the 2022 final to secure their first title in the competition.

History
Since its foundation in 1965, under the name of European Cup, the competition has been dominated by teams from Spain (mainly from Catalonia), Portugal and Italy. In 1997, the European Cup and the European Cup Winners' Cup were merged to create the Champions League. In 2007, the competition name and format was changed to form the European League, a 16-team competition with no preliminary rounds. In 2020, the format was changed to a 9-team competition with no preliminary rounds. In 2021, the format was changed to an 8-team competition with no proliminary rounds. In 2023, along with a renaming back to Champions League, the format was again changed to accommodate 32 teams and two preliminary rounds.

The most successful team is Barcelona, having won a record 22 titles, including eight consecutive between 1978 and 1985. Barcelona are followed by four other Spanish teams, making Spain the most successful country in the competition, with 44 titles. Four Portuguese teams have won the trophy by eight times, while two Italian teams have won the trophy by two times.

Format
Since 2021, the competition is composed by 8 teams placed into 2 groups. The first 2 teams of each group play the final-four.

Finals

Performances

By club

By country

External links
 Official website

 
Roller hockey competitions in Europe
Recurring sporting events established in 1965
1965 establishments in Europe
Multi-national professional sports leagues